In Fijian mythology (Fiji), Daucina ("torchbearer") is the great god of seafaring Fiji.  When Daucina was a toddler, he was only quiet when looking at a lamp. His mother tied fiery reeds to his head so that he would be calm.  He has roamed the coral reefs with a hood on ever since.  He is a trickster and a patron of adulterers, and a seducer of women.

References

Fijian deities
Love and lust gods
Sea and river gods
Trickster gods